Fairfax was a 52-gun third-rate  frigate of the Commonwealth of England, built by Peter Pett at Deptford Dockyard and in service from 1650 to 1653.

Naval service
Fairfax was commissioned in 1650 under Captain William Penn, then serving as Commonwealth's Vice Admiral for the Irish coast. In mid-1650 she saw action against French ships in the English Channel. Later that year her command was transferred to Captain John Lawson.

In 1651, Captain Penn was assigned to the role of Admiral in the Mediterranean, and chose Fairfax as his flagship. After an uneventful year of service, command was again transferred to Captain Lawson, under whose direction Fairfax participated in the Battle of Dover, and the Battle of Portland in the following year.

On 18 February 1653, Fairfax was accidentally set alight and burned beyond repair at Chatham Dockyard.

Notes

References

Ships of the English navy
1650s ships